"Shooting Star" is a song by British electronic group Deepest Blue. It was released on 23 August 2004 as the fourth and final single from their debut album Late September. It was their first single not to make the UK Singles Chart top 40, peaking at number 57. The group were dropped by their record label and decided to split up soon after the release of this single. Despite the commercial failure of the single, it is still used by Sky Sports as incidental music during UK football matches, and was used on Sky Sports News and Soccer Saturday from 2004 until 2007.

Track listings
CD single 1
 Radio Edit  
 Full Intention Remix  
 Deepest Blue Acoustic Version  
 CD-ROM Video  

CD single 2
 Radio Edit  
 Full Intention Remix

Production credits
Produced by Matt Schwartz
Written by Joel Edwards & Matt Schwartz
Drums by Darrin Mooney
Conducted & arranged by Simon Hale
Violins by Perry Montague-Manso, Patrick Kiernan, Jackie Shave & Gavyn Wright
Viola by Bruce White
Cello by David Daniels

Charts

References

2004 singles
Deepest Blue songs
Ministry of Sound singles
2004 songs
Data Records singles
Songs written by Matt Schwartz